Charles Muth Dwelley (March 8, 1908 – September 30, 1993) was a community activist of Skagit County and owner/editor in chief of The Concrete Herald newspaper for over 40 years, from 1929 to 1970. Many of his editorials were quoted nationwide in Reader's Digest, The New York Times, etc. and occasionally referred to among professional journalists as "Dwellisms." He served as the president of the Washington State Publishers' Association in 1957 and 1958, received multiple awards in journalism, and repeatedly represented Washington State at the National Editorial Association.

Personal life 

Dwelley was born in Mount Vernon, Washington, on March 8, 1908, into the family of Charles Lemuel Dwelley (1878–1964) and Mary Elizabeth Muth Dwelley (1877–1954). He was often referred to as "Chuck" to distinguish him from his father. The family had two other children: Chuck's older sister, Dorothy (born in 1905), and his younger brother, William (born in 1916).

Dwelley's father, Charles Lemuel, was the fourth child of Joseph F. Dwelley, one of the first settlers of Skagit County, who arrived in Washington from Kittery, Maine, in 1870. The family moved to Anacortes, Washington in 1910, shortly after Chuck's birth, where Chuck's father worked at a pulp mill until his retirement. Chuck graduated from Anacortes High School in 1925.

Dwelley was married three times. He married his first wife, Helen Lyle Grubb of Anacortes (born in 1910), on June 13, 1927. Following employment opportunities, the couple first moved to Sedro-Woolley, and in 1929, to Concrete, Washington, to work for The Concrete Herald. Their only child, Arthur "Art" Gilbert Dwelley, was born February 6, 1930. The couple lived on the top floor of the building where they published the newspaper most of their lives, until they divorced in the summer of 1961. Helen moved to Mount Vernon in July 1961, and died there in 1969.

Dwelley remarried on January 1, 1962. His second wife, Alice May Hurn, was born in Three Lakes, Washington in 1913. A widow with four children, she was treasurer of the Shepherd of the Hills Lutheran Church near Three Lakes in Snohomish County, Washington before moving to Concrete with Dwelley. Alice died on May 6, 1967, at the age 54.	
     
On March 16, 1968, Dwelley remarried for the last time. His third wife, Helen Lenore Pemberton (born December 14, 1910), held a journalism degree from Washington State University. She worked on internal publication for General Dynamics Corporation, and left her job to live with Dwelley in Concrete. In the early 1990s, the couple moved to Tenino, Washington, to live with Dwelley's son, Art. Charles Dwelley died on September 30, 1993. He was buried in Pleasant Ridge Cemetery in La Conner, Washington. Helen moved to California, where she died on November 18, 2011, at almost 101 years old. She was buried next to Dwelley in La Conner.

All three of Dwelley's wives helped him write for The Concrete Herald. His son, Art followed his father's trade: he edited and published a local newspaper (the Tenino Independent), was a community activist, and became a local historian. He died on October 10, 2000.

Career in journalism 
Dwelley started his career as a journalist working for the Anacortes Citizen newspaper in Anacortes, Washington, where he had lived since early childhood. After his marriage, he moved to Sedro-Woolley to work for The Courier Times. In 1929, Frank Evans, editor of The Courier Times, sent Dwelley to Concrete, Washington, in an effort to save a failing local newspaper: The Concrete Herald, which Evans just purchased.

The Concrete Herald 

Evans and Dwelley assumed ownership of the newspaper and its debts, reincorporating it in 1930. Shortly afterwards, the Depression struck. The financial situation for the newspaper remained dire throughout the 1930s. In one incident, Dwelley invited his readers to pay for the newspaper issue that he couldn't publish due to medical reasons in order to help pay for his medical bill.

Living with his wife and newborn son in the same building where he operated Linotype machines, young Dwelley worked hard and managed to make the newspaper work, eventually paying all the debts and buying out Evans' share. He is credited with "rescuing the failing Concrete Herald." Many of his peers, including fellow editor and politician Sim Wilson, noted the accomplishment of maintaining a profitable newspaper in a small town. From 1930 to 1943, the population of Concrete declined slightly, but the number of Herald subscriptions rose by 67%.

World War II interruption 
On March 27, 1944, Dwelley learned that his younger brother William had been killed in the European theater of war, and voluntarily enlisted in the Navy. He received bootcamp training at Farragut, Idaho, and graduated with honors as Torpedoman Third Class from the Torpedo School at Naval Base San Diego as in December 1944. Dwelley was assigned to the Seventh Fleet and stationed in the Admiralty Islands. As it became apparent that the Navy has a surplus of torpedomen, in April 1945 he was assigned to Manila, Philippines, as a shore patrol officer. Dwelley returned to Seattle on a liberty ship on December 10, 1945, and was discharged at Bremerton, Washington, on December 16, having served 21 months.

During this time, Dwelley's wife, Helen Lyle, edited a truncated version of The Concrete Herald from April 1944 to November 1944, but couldn't keep up. From November 2, 1944, to May 31, 1945, the newspaper's publication was completely suspended.

Libel controversy 
In 1956, The Concrete Herald and Dwelley personally were sued for libel by Jacob Koops, a police judge of the city of Lyman, Washington, in connection to Dwelley's July 1955 editorial comments on the conduct of Koop's office. At that time, a Washington State Supreme Court decision imposed serious limitations on criticism in newspaper columns. The proceedings lasted almost three years, but the court eventually acquitted Dwelley and his paper, which Dwelley celebrated with an 80-point bold headline "WE WON," surpassing the size of the headlines proclaiming the end of World War II.

The Concrete Herald at its zenith 

From 1949 on, Dwelley's editorials were cited on the radio nationwide, reprinted in nationwide publications such as Reader's Digest and The New York Times, praised for their "wry sense of humor," and referred to among professional journalists as "Dwellisms."

Dwelley believed that editorials were an integral part of a local newspaper, and that editors should express their personal opinions to make local newspapers interesting and worthy. He also advocated short editorials as more effective at delivering the point to the readers.

In 1951, over 75% of the Herald's subscribers were local residents of Concrete, but throughout the 1950s, The Concrete Herald subscription base rose to include all of upper Skagit Valley, from Lyman in the west to Newhalem in the northeast. In 1956, the Herald was believed to be "one of the finest edited newspapers in the state." By 1957, the circulation of the Herald exceeded the population of Concrete.

Dwelley's editorials won first-place awards from the Washington State Press Club two years in a row, in 1949 and in 1950. In 1952, he was at the center of attention again, labeled a "Ladies' man" by his colleagues when Ladies' Home Journal picked Dwelley as among the four best editorial writers in United States. In the same year, Dwelley won the second-place award for Distinguished Reporting from the Washington State Press Club.

In 1951, Dwelley published a special 44-page edition of The Concrete Herald commemorating the 50th anniversary of the paper, for which he received a first-place award from the National Newspaper Association.

From 1953 until 1957, Dwelley and his wife Helen served as judges for the Washington State Press Club contests. In 1958 (when he was off the panel of judges) Dwelley won another first-place prize for Excellence in Community Service. The last award Dwelley received for his work on The Concrete Herald was first place in Newspaper Leadership, in April 1970.

The sale of The Concrete Herald and its aftermath 

In September 1970, having marked 40 years of editing the newspaper, Dwelley retired, selling The Concrete Herald to Robert and June Fader. Dwelley corresponded with the paper's new editors, praising occasional "scathing" editorials. In 1989, however, Herald readers were "shocked" when the paper was sold to an opportunistic businessman with no experience in publishing, John Falavolito. In two years, The Concrete Herald had failed and ceased publication.

Eighteen years later, in 2009, Concrete resident Jason Miller revived the newspaper in both paper and electronic formats. The successful resurrection of the paper version in the digital age came as a surprise for the publishing industry and reportedly "rejuvenated" local community.

Activity in journalist organizations 
After Dwelley's editorials received national attention in 1949, he was asked to share his thoughts on newspaper editorials with the members of the Washington Newspaper Publishers' Association (WNPA). In 1950, he was elected secretary of the association. On November 17, 1950, at the University of Washington, Dwelley was initiated in Sigma Delta Chi.	

Dwelley served on the Advisory Committee for the WNPA in 1952–1953 and on its Finance Committee in 1954–1955. He was elected to serve as the vice-president in 1956–57, and, finally, its president in 1957–58.	

Dwelley represented Washington State on the National Editorial Association's Freedom of Information Committee in 1953–1954 and on the Editorial Page Committee in 1956–1957.

Retirement 
After the Herald's sale in 1972, Dwelley's family moved to La Conner, Washington, where he continued writing and editing. For years, Dwelley wrote a column called "The Bridge Tender" for a local newspaper, the Channel Town Press, and published and edited a few history books, including a history of Concrete (And They Called the Town Concrete) and Skagit Memories. He was also elected an honorary lifetime member of the Washington Newspaper Publishers' Association, and occasionally attended its gatherings.

Activism 
In addition to editing and publishing The Concrete Herald, Dwelley was actively engaged in the local community. For 40 years beginning in 1929, Dwelley fought dust pollution created by the Superior Portland Cement Company, which operated a large cement plant in Concrete. Led by Dwelley, the community group from Concrete successfully involved Senator Lowell Peterson in the issue, conducted a dust emission study that proved a pollution level more than ten times over acceptable levels, and pushed for the creation of the Northwest Air Pollution Authority. Five days after the first meeting of the State Air Pollution Control Board, the plant operator completely closed the plant.

Dwelley also fought for the development of local infrastructure, and beginning in 1948, led the campaign that resulted in the construction of the North Cascades Highway. He was elected president of the North Cross-State Highway Association in 1959. Through his editorials, Dwelley successfully campaigned for the construction of the first bridge across Skagit River in the upper valley. In August 2006, a plaque honoring Dwelley's efforts was mounted on the bridge.

For several years, Dwelley presided over the Concrete Chamber of Commerce. In 1960, he received a Lions Clubs International award for his community service to Concrete.

Bibliography

See also 
 The Concrete Herald
 Concrete, Washington
 Skagit County

Notes

References

Literature cited

People from Mount Vernon, Washington
Journalists from Washington (state)
American newspaper editors
1908 births
1993 deaths
People from Thurston County, Washington
20th-century American journalists
American male journalists